Manuel (or Emmanuel) Chrysoloras (c. 1350 – 15 April 1415) was a Byzantine Greek classical scholar, humanist, philosopher, professor, and translator of ancient Greek texts during the Renaissance. Serving as the ambassador for the Byzantine emperor Manuel II Palaiologos in medieval Italy, he became a renowned teacher of Greek literature and history in the republics of Florence and Venice, and today he's widely regarded as a pioneer in the introduction of ancient Greek literature to Western Europe during the Late Middle Ages.

Biography

Chrysoloras was born in Constantinople, at the time capital of the Byzantine Empire, to a distinguished Greek Orthodox family. In 1390, he led an embassy sent to the Republic of Venice by the Byzantine emperor Manuel II Palaiologos to ask the aid of the Christian princes of Medieval Europe against the invasions of the Byzantine Empire by the Muslim Ottoman Turks. Roberto de' Rossi of Florence met him in Venice, and, in 1395, Rossi's acquaintance Jacopo d'Angelo set off for Constantinople to study Greek with Chrysoloras. In 1396, Coluccio Salutati, the Chancellor of Florence, invited him to Florence to teach Greek grammar and literature, quoting the Roman lawyer and statesman Cicero:
"The verdict of our own Cicero confirms that we Romans either made wiser innovations than theirs by ourselves or improved on what we took from them, but of course, as he himself says elsewhere with reference to his own day: "Italy is invincible in war, Greece in culture." For our part, and we mean no offence, we firmly believe that both Greeks and Latins have always taken learning to a higher level by extending it to each other's literature."

Chrysoloras arrived in the winter of 1397, an event remembered by one of his most famous pupils, the Italian humanist scholar Leonardo Bruni, as a great new opportunity: there were many teachers of law, but no one had studied Greek in northern Italy for 700 years. Another very famous pupil of Chrysoloras was Ambrogio Traversari, who became general of the Camaldolese order. Chrysoloras remained only a few years in Florence, from 1397 to 1400, teaching Greek, starting with the rudiments. He moved on to teach in Bologna, and later in Venice and Rome. Though he taught widely, a handful of his chosen students remained a close-knit group, among the first humanists of the Renaissance. Among his pupils were numbered some of the foremost figures of the revival of Greek studies in Renaissance Italy. Aside from Bruni, d'Angelo, and Ambrogio Traversari, they included Guarino da Verona, Coluccio Salutati, Roberto Rossi, Niccolò de' Niccoli, Carlo Marsuppini, Pier Paolo Vergerio, Uberto Decembrio, Poggio Bracciolini, Palla Strozzi, and many others.

Having visited Milan and Pavia, and having resided for several years in Venice, he went to Rome on the invitation of Bruni, who was then secretary to Pope Gregory XII. In 1408, he was sent to Paris on an important mission from the Byzantine emperor Manuel II Palaiologos. In 1413, he went to Germany on an embassy to the Holy Roman Emperor Sigismund, the object of which was to fix a place for the church council that later assembled at Constance. Chrysoloras was on his way there, having been chosen to represent the Greek Church, when he died suddenly. His death gave rise to commemorative essays of which Guarino da Verona made a collection in Chrysolorina.

Chrysoloras translated the works of Homer, Aristotle, and Plato's Republic into Latin. His own works, which circulated in manuscript in his lifetime, include brief works on the Procession of the Holy Ghost, and letters to his brothers, to Bruni, Guarino, Traversari, and to Strozzi, as well as two which were eventually printed, his Erotemata (Questions) which was the first basic Greek grammar in use in Western Europe, first published in 1484 and widely reprinted, and which enjoyed considerable success not only among his pupils in Florence, but also among later leading humanists, being immediately studied by Thomas Linacre at Oxford and by Desiderius Erasmus at Cambridge; and Epistolæ tres de comparatione veteris et novæ Romæ (Three Letters on the Comparison of Old and New Rome, i.e. a comparison of Rome and Constantinople). Many of his treatises on morals and ethics and other philosophical subjects came into print in the 17th and 18th centuries, because of their antiquarian interest. He was chiefly influential through his teaching in familiarizing men such as Leonardo Bruni, Coluccio Salutati, Jacopo d'Angelo, Roberto de' Rossi, Carlo Marsuppini, Pietro Candido Decembrio, Guarino da Verona, Poggio Bracciolini, with the masterpieces of Western philosophy and ancient Greek literature.

See also
Greek scholars in the Renaissance

References

Further reading
 Chrysoloras's Erotemata are edited by A. Rollo, Gli Erotemata tra Crisolora e Guarino (Percorsi dei classici 21), Messina 2012.
 Chrysoloras's letters can be found in Patrologia Graeca, ed. J.-P. Migne, vol, 156, Paris 1866.
 M. Baxandall, 'Guarino, Pisanello and Manuel Chrysoloras', Journal of the Warburg and Courtauld Institutes 28 (1965), 183–204.
 Émile Legrand: Notice biographique sur Manuel Chrysoloras, Paris 1894.
 Jonathan Harris, Greek Émigrés in the West, 1400–1520, Camberley UK: Porphyrogenitus, 1995. 
 S. Mergiali-Sahas, S., ‘Manuel Chrysoloras: an ideal model of a scholar ambassador’, Byzantine Studies/Etudes Byzantines, 3 (1998), 1–12
 I. Thompson, `Manuel Chrysoloras and the early Italian Renaissance', Greek, Roman and Byzantine Studies, 7 (1966), 63–82
 Lydia Thorn-Wikkert, Manuel Chrysoloras (ca. 1350–1415): Eine Biographie des byzantinischen Intellektuellen vor dem Hintergrund der hellenistischen Studien in der italienischen Renaissance, Frankfurt am Main, 2006.
 N.G. Wilson, From Byzantium to Italy. Greek Studies in the Italian Renaissance, London, 1992.

External links
 
 Michael D. Reeve, "On the role of Greek in Renaissance scholarship.'
 Jonathan Harris, 'Byzantines in Renaissance Italy'.
 Richard L.S. Evans, "Chrysoloras' Greek: The Pedagogy of Cultural Transformation."
 

1355 births
1415 deaths
14th-century Byzantine writers
14th-century Greek educators
14th-century Latin writers
14th-century translators
15th-century Byzantine writers
15th-century Greek educators
15th-century Latin writers
15th-century translators
Ambassadors of the Byzantine Empire to the Republic of Venice
Byzantine grammarians
Byzantine philosophers
Constantinopolitan Greeks
Eastern Orthodox Christians from the Byzantine Empire
Eastern Orthodox philosophers
Greek–Latin translators
Greek expatriates in Italy
Greek Latinists
Greek Renaissance humanists
Immigrants to the Republic of Venice
Renaissance writers
Translators of Ancient Greek texts
Translators of Homer
Writers from Constantinople